Fowke may refer to:

 Edith Fowke
 Francis Fowke (1823–1865), British engineer and architect
 Frederick Luther Fowke
 George Henry Fowke
 Gerard Fowke
 Gustavus Fowke (1880–1946), English soldier and cricketer
 John Fowke
 Martha Fowke
 Philip Fowke
 Phineas Fowke
 Thomas Fowke
 Meredith Fowke

See also
 Fowke baronets
 Fowkes (disambiguation)